Neptune's Brood is a science fiction novel by British author Charles Stross, set in the same universe as Saturn's Children, but thousands of years later and with all new characters.

The novel was shortlisted for the 2014 Hugo Award for Best Novel.

Fictional universe

The setting of Saturn's Children was our solar system.  Homo sapiens were extinct, and all the characters were androids.  In Neptune's Brood, set in AD 7000, Homo sapiens have been resurrected three times, but remain insignificant and are known as the "Fragile".  In the novel, "humanity" is used for the "mechanocyte"-based metahuman successor life forms, vastly improved over the original androids.

The setting of Neptune's Brood is the part of the galaxy that has since been colonized with slower than light travel.  A large part of the plot turns on the question of financing such colonization.  Money is entirely cryptocurrency and is known as "bitcoin", an intentional reference by Stross to the real-life cryptocurrency. Money has been divided into three classes: "fast", "medium", "slow".  Fast money is ordinary day-to-day cash, medium money is ordinary investment instruments, suitable for use within a single planetary system, and slow money is interstellar investment instruments, understood to take centuries, even millennia, to mature.  Slow money transactions rely on a three-way cryptoverification scheme, and so trade at one-third the speed of light.

Two thousand years before the main plot begins, one start-up colony, Atlantis, broke contact without warning or explanation with the rest of humanity, and two attempts to physically contact them also went dark.

Plot summary

The novel presents itself as an extended first-person report by Krina Alizond-114, created by the "incalculably wealthy" Sondra Alizond-1 to be a scholar of accountancy practice historiography.  Her clone sister, Ana, has disappeared, and Krina is following her trail.

Reception
Publishers Weekly wrote:

According to Kirkus Reviews:

It was described by Saxon Bullock as follows in SFX:

References

External links 
  Disputes the economic "realism" of the novel.

2013 British novels
2013 science fiction novels
British science fiction novels
Cryptocurrencies in fiction
Novels by Charles Stross
Space opera novels
Underwater civilizations in fiction
Space colonization literature
Novels about androids
Ace Books books